Kerry South was a parliamentary constituency represented in Dáil Éireann, the lower house of the Irish parliament or Oireachtas, from 1937 to 2016. The constituency elected 3 deputies (Teachtaí Dála, commonly known as TDs). The method of election was proportional representation by means of the single transferable vote (PR-STV).

History and boundaries
The constituency was located in the southern half of County Kerry taking in the Dingle and Iveragh peninsulas, including the towns of Killarney, Dingle, Cahirciveen, Killorglin and Kenmare.

It was established by the Electoral (Revision of Constituencies) Act 1935 when the former Kerry constituency was divided into the constituencies of Kerry North and Kerry South. It was first used at the 1937 general election electing members of the 9th Dáil.

The Electoral (Amendment) Act 2009 defined the constituency as:

"The county of Kerry, except the part thereof which is comprised in the constituency of Kerry North–West Limerick."

It was abolished at the 2016 general election and replaced by the new Kerry constituency.

TDs

Elections

2011 general election

2007 general election

2002 general election

1997 general election

1992 general election

1989 general election

1987 general election

November 1982 general election

February 1982 general election

1981 general election

1977 general election

1973 general election

1969 general election

1966 by-election
Following the death of Fianna Fáil TD Honor Crowley, a by-election was held on 7 December 1966. The seat was won by the Fianna Fáil candidate John O'Leary.

1965 general election

1961 general election

1957 general election

1954 general election

1951 general election

1948 general election

1945 by-election
Following the death of Fianna Fáil TD Frederick Crowley, a by-election was held on 4 December 1945. The seat was won by the Fianna Fáil candidate Honor Crowley, widow of the deceased TD.

1944 by-election
Following the resignation of Fine Gael TD Fionán Lynch upon his appointment as a judge, a by-election was held on 10 November 1944. The seat was won by the Fianna Fáil candidate Donal O'Donoghue.

1944 general election

1943 general election

1938 general election

1937 general election

See also
Dáil constituencies
Politics of the Republic of Ireland
Historic Dáil constituencies
Elections in the Republic of Ireland

References

External links
Oireachtas Members Database

Dáil constituencies in the Republic of Ireland (historic)
Historic constituencies in County Kerry
1937 establishments in Ireland
Constituencies established in 1937
2016 disestablishments in Ireland
Constituencies disestablished in 2016